The Medal "1300th Anniversary of Bulgaria".  Established in 1981, it was awarded until 1990. It was awarded to deserving prominent citizens in honor of the 1300th Anniversary of the Bulgarian State.

Notable recipients 
 Todor Zhivkov - Politician
 Nicolai Ghiaurov - Opera Singer
 Yordan Milanov - Major General of the Bulgarian Air Forces

References 

Orders, decorations, and medals of Bulgaria
Titles
Awards established in 1981